is a passenger railway station in the city of Yachiyo, Chiba, Japan, operated by the private railway operator Keisei Electric Railway.

Lines
Keisei-Ōwada Station is served by the Keisei Main Line, and is 38.7 km from the Tokyo terminus at Keisei-Ueno Station.

Station layout
Keisei-Ōwada Station has two opposed side platforms connected by an elevated station building.

Platforms

History
Keisei-Ōwada Station was opened on 9 December 1926.

Station numbering was introduced to all Keisei Line stations on 17 July 2010. Keisei-Ōwada Station was assigned station number KS30.

Passenger statistics
In fiscal 2019, the station was used by an average of 12,638 passengers daily.

Surrounding area
 Yachiyo City Hall
 Yachiyo High School

See also
 List of railway stations in Japan

References

External links

  Keisei Station layout 

Railway stations in Japan opened in 1926
Railway stations in Chiba Prefecture
Keisei Main Line
Yachiyo, Chiba